{{Infobox tennis player season
| name                              = Rafael Nadal
| image                             = Rafael Nadal Iberia (cropped).jpg
| image_size                        = 
| caption                           = 
| fullname                          = Rafael Nadal Parera
| country                           = 
| calendarprizemoney                = $10,171,998
| singlesrecord                     = 
| singlestitles                     = 7
| yearendsinglesranking             = No. 1
| singlesrankingchange              =  1
| AustralianOpenresult              = QF
| FrenchOpenresult                  = W| Wimbledonresult                   = W| USOpenresult                      = W| Othertournaments                  = yes
| MastersCupresult                  = F
| doublesrecord                     = 
| doublestitles                     = 1
| yearenddoublesranking             = No. 79
| doublesrankingchange              =  53
| previous_season                   = 2009
| next_season                       = 2011
}}

The 2010 Rafael Nadal tennis season''' is lauded as one of the greatest seasons of all time. Nadal himself also called it his best year. In the 2010 season, Nadal became the first male player in tennis history to win Grand Slam tournaments on three different surfaces (clay, grass and hard court) in the same year, referred to as a Surface Slam. He became the first man since Rod Laver in 1969 to win the French-Wimbledon-US triplet in a calendar year, being the fourth in history. At 24 years, 3 months and 10 days, after his win at the US Open, he simultaneously became the youngest player in the Open Era to complete both (in singles) the Career Grand Slam, and the Career Golden Slam. With this achievement, he was only the second man in history to complete the Career Golden Slam in singles, after Andre Agassi did so in 1996. He also became the third man to win at least two majors on three different surfaces in his career (Double Career Surface Slam). Nadal further cemented his place in history by becoming the first, and only player to-date, to win Monte-Carlo Masters, Madrid Masters, Rome Masters, and the French Open in a calendar year, a feat known as the Clay Slam.

Year summary

Capital World Tennis Championship
Nadal began the year by participating in the Capitala World Tennis Championship in Abu Dhabi, United Arab Emirates. He defeated compatriot David Ferrer (7-6(3), 6-3) to reach his second final in the exhibition tournament. In the final, Nadal defeated Robin Söderling (7-6(3), 7-5).

Qatar ExxonMobil Open
Secondly, Nadal participated in the Australian Open warm-up tournament, the Qatar ExxonMobil Open ATP 250 event in Doha, where he lost in the final. He defeated the Italians Simone Bolelli in the first round (6-3, 6-3) and Potito Starace (6-2, 6-2) in the second round. In the quarter-finals, the Spaniard defeated the Belgian Steve Darcis: 6-1, 2-0(ret). After that, in the semi-final, Nadal defeated the fifth seed Viktor Troicki (6-1, 6-3), winning eleven games in a row. In the final, Nadal lost to Russian Nikolay Davydenko (6-0, 6-7(8), 4-6), despite dominating the opening set and holding two match points in the second set. Davydenko had also defeated Roger Federer in the semi-final before facing Nadal in the final.

Australian Open
In the first round of the Australian Open, Nadal defeated the Australian Peter Luczak (7-6(0), 6-1, 6-4). In the second round, he beat Lukáš Lacko (6-2, 6-2, 6-2). In the third round, he was tested by Philipp Kohlschreiber, finally beating him in four sets (6-4, 6-2, 2-6, 7-5). In the fourth round, he beat the Croatian Ivo Karlović, (6-4, 4-6, 6-4, 6-4). In the quarter-finals, Nadal pulled out in the third set against Andy Murray, having lost the first two sets (6-3, 7-6(2)). After having his knee examined, doctors told Nadal to take two weeks of rest followed by two weeks of rehabilitation.

In singles, Nadal reached the semi-finals at the BNP Paribas Open in Indian Wells as the current defending champion. However, the eventual winner, Ivan Ljubičić, defeated him in three sets. He and López won the doubles title by defeating the number one seeds Daniel Nestor and Nenad Zimonjić. This boosted Nadal's doubles ranking 175 places, going from number 241 to being number 66 in the world. After Indian Wells, Nadal reached the semi-finals of Sony Ericsson Open where he lost to the eventual champion Andy Roddick in three sets.

Monte Carlo Rolex Masters
Nadal reached the final of the Monte-Carlo Rolex Masters in Monaco after beating the fellow Spaniard David Ferrer (6-3, 6-2) in the semi-finals. This was Nadal's first tour final since Doha earlier that year. He won the final with a (6-0, 6-1) score over his compatriot Fernando Verdasco. He lost fourteen games throughout all five matches, the fewest he had ever lost en route to a championship, and the tournament's final was the shortest Masters 1000 final in terms of games. With this win, Nadal became the first player in open history to win a tournament title for six straight years.

Unlike previous years, Nadal chose to skip the Barcelona tournament despite the fact that he was the five-time defending champion.

Internazional BNL d'Italia
His next tournament was the 2010 Internazionali BNL d'Italia. He defeated Philipp Kohlschreiber, Victor Hănescu, and Stanislas Wawrinka all in straight sets to win his 57th straight match, in April. In the semi-finals, he faced a resilient Ernests Gulbis, who defeated Roger Federer earlier in the tournament and battled Nadal into a three-set-match for the first time in this clay court season. Nadal eventually prevailed with a (6-4, 3-6, 6-4) in two hours and forty minutes. Then he defeated compatriot David Ferrer in the final (7-5, 6-2) for his fifth title at Rome, to equal Andre Agassi's record of winning 17 ATP Masters 1000 titles.

Madrid Open
Nadal then entered the 2010 Mutua Madrileña Madrid Open, where he had finished runner-up the previous year. By being one of the top eight seeds, he received a bye in the first round. In the second round, he defeated the qualifier Oleksandr Dolgopolov, Jr. in straight sets. He then played the six-foot-nine American John Isner, and Nadal comfortably came through in straight sets, (7-5, 6-4). In the quarter-finals, he defeated Gaël Monfils (6-1, 6-3) and then his countryman Nicolás Almagro, who was playing the first Masters 1000 semifinal of his career, (4-6, 6-2, 6-2). The first set of his match against Almagro would be just the second set he lost on clay courts up to this point in 2010. Nadal then defeated his longtime rival Roger Federer (6-4, 7-6(5)), avenging his 2009 final loss to Federer. The win gave him his 18th Masters 1000 title, breaking the all-time record. He became the first player to win all three clay court Masters 1000 titles in a single year and the first player to win three consecutive Masters events. Nadal moved back to No. 2 in the rankings the following day.

French Open
Entering the French Open, many were expecting another Nadal-Federer final. However, this became impossible when rival Robin Söderling defeated Federer (3-6, 6-3, 7-5, 6-4) in the quarter-finals. The failure of Federer to reach the semi-finals would allow Nadal to regain the world number 1 ranking, if he were to win the tournament. Nadal advanced to the final and defeated Soderling (6-4, 6-2, 6-4) to win the French Open. The win gave Nadal his seventh Grand Slam, tying him with John McEnroe, John Newcombe and Mats Wilander on the all-time list, and allowed Nadal to reclaim the position of ATP World Number One; denying his biggest rival Roger Federer the all-time record for weeks at No. 1. With this win, Nadal became the first man to win the three Masters series on clay and the French Open; this was dubbed by the media as the "Clay Slam". This victory at Roland Garros marked the second time that Nadal had won the French Open without dropping a single set (tying the record held by Björn Borg). With the win in Paris he also booked his place at the World Tour Finals in London, and became the first player to win five French Open titles in six years.

As of 2017, Nadal's clay season was the second most successful in his career, as he earned 5,000 points after winning 4 titles. This was only surpassed by his 2013 season, in which Nadal earned 5,100 points after winning Barcelona, Madrid, Rome and the French Open, and being runner-up in Monte-Carlo.

Aegon Championships
In June, Nadal entered the Aegon Championships—which he won in 2008—at the prestigious Queen's Club. He played singles and doubles at this grass court tournament as a warm up for the Wimbledon Championships. By being one of the top eight seeds, he received a bye in the first round. In the second round, where he played his first match on grass since winning Wimbledon in 2008, he defeated the Brazilian Marcos Daniel easily in two sets, (6-2, 6-2). In the third round, he played Denis Istomin of Uzbekistan, whom he defeated (7-6(4), 4-6, 6-4), to advance to the quarter-finals. However, in the quarter-finals he was defeated by his compatriot Feliciano López (6-7(5), 4-6), and left the competition without a title.

Wimbledon
At the 2010 Wimbledon Championships Nadal started by beating Kei Nishikori (6-2, 6-4, 6-4) in the first round. In the second round, he fought hard and succeeded against Robin Haase after five sets (5-7, 6-2, 3-6, 6-0, 6-3). In the third round, he defeated Philipp Petzschner. The match was a 5-set thriller with Nadal triumphing (6-4, 4-6, 6-7, 6-2, 6-3). During this match, Nadal was warned twice for receiving coaching from his coach and uncle, Toni Nadal, resulting in a $2,000 fine by Wimbledon officials. Allegedly, encouraging words for Nadal shouted during the match were some sort of coaching code signal. After that, Nadal comfortably beat the French Paul-Henri Mathieu in three sets (6-4, 6-2, 6-2). In the quarter-finals, he got past the Swedish Robin Söderling in four sets (3-6, 6-3, 7-6(7-4), 6-1). He then defeated Andy Murray in straight sets (6-4, 7-6(8-6), 6-4) to reach his fourth Wimbledon final.

In the 2010 Wimbledon men's title, Nadal won the tournament by defeating Tomáš Berdych in straight sets (6-3, 7-5, 6-4). After the win, Rafa said, "It is more than a dream for me" and thanked the crowd for being both kind and supportive to him during this match and also in the semi-final against Andy Murray. The win gave him a second Wimbledon title and an eighth career major title, at the age of 24.

Rogers Cup
In his first hard-court tournament since Miami, Nadal advanced to the semi-finals of the Rogers Cup, along with No. 2 Novak Djokovic, No. 3 Roger Federer, and No. 4 Andy Murray, after coming back from a one-set deficit to defeat the German Philipp Kohlschreiber (3-6, 6-3, 6-4). In the semifinal, defending champion Andy Murray defeated Nadal (6-3, 6-4), becoming the only player to triumph over the Spaniard twice in 2010. Nadal also competed in the doubles tournament with Novak Djokovic in a one-time, high-profile partnership, not seen since 1976 when Jimmy Connors and Arthur Ashe as World No.1 and No.2 paired up, making a double dream team. However, they lost in the first round to Canadians Milos Raonic and Vasek Pospisil.

The next week, Nadal was the top seed at the Cincinnati Masters, losing in the quarter-finals to 2006 Australian Open finalist Marcos Baghdatis.

US Open

At the 2010 US Open, Nadal was the top seed for the second time in three years. He defeated Teymuraz Gabashvili, Denis Istomin, Gilles Simon, 23rd seed Feliciano López, 8th seed Fernando Verdasco, and 12th seed Mikhail Youzhny, all without dropping a set, to reach his first US Open final. By doing that he became the 8th man in the Open Era to reach the final of all four majors at the age 24; the second youngest to ever do so, behind only Jim Courier. In the final, he defeated 3rd seed Novak Djokovic (6-4, 5-7, 6-4, 6-2), which completed the Career Grand Slam for Nadal, and he became the second male after Andre Agassi to complete a Career Golden Slam. Nadal also became the first man to win Grand Slams on clay, grass, and hard court surfaces in the same year (later accomplished by Djokovic in 2021 after winning the Australian Open, French Open and Wimbledon Championships), and the first to win the French Open, Wimbledon, and the US Open in the same year since Rod Laver in 1969. With the US Open win, Nadal became, along with Mats Wilander, the only male players to win at least two Grand Slams each on clay, grass, and hard court in their careers (Novak Djokovic later completed this feat with his second French Open title in 2021). After all that, he also became the first left-handed man to win the US Open since John McEnroe in 1984. This victory also clinched the year-end number one ranking for 2010, making Nadal the third player (after Ivan Lendl in 1989 and Roger Federer in 2009) to regain the year-end number one ranking after having lost it.

Thailand Open
Nadal began his Asian tour at 2010 PTT Thailand Open in Bangkok, where he reached the semi-finals, losing to his compatriot Guillermo García-López.

Japan Open
He was able to regroup, and at the 2010 Rakuten Japan Open Tennis Championships in Tokyo (debut), he defeated Santiago Giraldo, Milos Raonic and Dmitry Tursunov. In the semi-finals against Viktor Troicki, Nadal saved two match points in the deciding-set tiebreaker, to win it 9-7 in the end. In the final, Nadal comfortably defeated Gaël Monfils (6-1, 7-5) for his 7th title of the season.

Shanghai Rolex Masters
Nadal next played in the 2010 Shanghai Rolex Masters, in Shanghai, where he was the top seed, but lost to world's number twelve, Jürgen Melzer in the third round, stopping his record streak of 21 consecutive Masters quarter-finals. On 5 November, Nadal announced that he was pulling out of the Paris Masters due to tendinitis in his left shoulder.

ATP World Tour Finals
At the ATP World Tour Finals in London, Nadal defeated Andy Roddick (3-6, 7-6(5), 6-4) in the first match. He then beat Djokovic in a tight match where Djokovic had trouble with his contact lenses, prevailing (7-5, 6-2). A further victory against Berdych, (7-6(3), 6-1), sent him to his third World Tour Final semi-final. It was the first time he had won all three round-robins, in stark contrast to the previous year. In the semi-finals, he was thrice two points from defeat and was able to win the match on his third match point (7-6(5), 3-6, 7-6(6)). In the final, Nadal lost against Roger Federer with a score of (3-6, 6-3, 1-6). This was Nadal's last tournament in the 2010 professional tennis season.

Match for Africa
Finally, he played Federer in the two-match exhibition Match for Africa for the Roger Federer Foundation and the Rafa Nadal Foundation. The first match took place in Zürich on December 21, 2010, and was won by Federer, (4-6, 6-3, and 6-3). The following match was played in Madrid, and Nadal beat Federer with a score of (7-6 (3), 4-6, 6-1).

All matches

Singles

Source (ATP)

Doubles

Source (ATP)

Exhibitions

See also
 2010 ATP Tour
 2010 Roger Federer tennis season
 2010 Novak Djokovic tennis season

References

External links 
 
ATP tour profile

 
Rafael Nadal tennis seasons
Nadal